The Committee on National Security Systems (CNSS) is a United States intergovernmental organization that sets policy for the security of the US security systems.

History
The National Security Telecommunications and Information Systems Security Committee (NSTISSC) was established under National Security Directive 42, "National Policy for the Security of National Security Telecommunications and Information Systems", dated 5 July 1990. On October 16, 2001, President George W. Bush signed Executive Order 13231, the Critical Infrastructure Protection in the Information Age, re-designating the National Security Telecommunications and Information Systems Security Committee (NSTISSC) as the Committee on National Security Systems.

Activities
The CNSS holds discussions of policy issues, sets national policy, directions, operational procedures, and guidance for the information systems operated by the U.S. Government, its contractors or agents that either contain classified information, involve intelligence activities, involve cryptographic activities related to national security, involve command and control of military forces, involve equipment that is an integral part of a weapon or weapons system(s), or are critical to the direct fulfillment of military or intelligence missions.

The Department of Defense chairs the committee. Membership consists of representatives from 21 U.S. Government Departments and Agencies with voting privileges, to include the CIA, DIA, DOD, DOJ, FBI, NSA, and the National Security Council, and all United States Military Services. Members not on the voting committee include the DISA, NGA, NIST, and the NRO. The operating Agency for CNSS appears to be the National Security Agency, which serves as primary contact for public inquiries.

Education certification
The CNSS defines several standards, which include standards on training in IT security. Current certifications include:
 NSTISSI-4011 National Training Standard for Information Systems Security (INFOSEC) Professionals
 CNSSI-4012 National Information Assurance Training Standard for Senior Systems Managers
 CNSSI-4013 National Information Assurance Training Standard For System Administrators
 CNSSI-4014 Information Assurance Training Standard for Information Systems Security Officers
 NSTISSI-4015 National Training Standard for Systems Certifiers
 CNSSI-4016 National Information Assurance Training Standard For Risk Analysts

References

External links
CNSS Official Website
Vulnerability Assessment

United States government secrecy
Independent agencies of the United States government
Government agencies established in 2001
Computer security organizations
2001 establishments in the United States